is a former Japanese football player.

Club statistics

References

External links

1989 births
Living people
Association football people from Saitama Prefecture
Japanese footballers
J1 League players
J2 League players
Montedio Yamagata players
Tokushima Vortis players
Association football midfielders